Engine failure on take-off (EFTO) is a situation, when flying an aircraft, where an engine has failed, or is not delivering sufficient power, at any time between brake release and the wheels leaving the ground / V2. The phases of flight are de-lineated to allow simplified standard procedures for different aircraft types to be developed. If an aircraft suffered engine failure on takeoff, the standard procedure for most aircraft would be to abort the takeoff.

In small airplanes, if the engine failure occurs before VR (Rotation Speed), the pilot should reduce throttles to idle, deploy speed brakes (if equipped), and brake as necessary. If the engine failure occurs just after liftoff, the pilot must make a decision if there is enough runway to achieve an emergency runway landing, or if an off field landing is required.  One of the biggest mistakes a pilot can make is attempting to turn around and return to the airport for an emergency landing.  If altitude permits, this could be an option (i.e. if at or above 1,000 feet AGL) but most pilots are trained to avoid the obvious tendency to turn around and instead land the plane straight forward.

Common first steps after an EFTO would be to fly at the best glide speed (VBG), retract flaps if airspeed permits, unlatch the door, and land straight ahead.  Returning to the airport with a steep turn has a high probability of resulting in a stall or spin.  Although it seems counterintuitive, the NTSB has recorded numerous fatal crashes due to this mistake.

In large airplanes e.g. commercial airliners, before the take-off is commenced, the highest speed from which a safe stop can be achieved on the remaining runway is calculated. This speed is called V1. If the pilot hasn't initiated a stop when accelerating through V1 during the take-off run, the take-off must be continued even in the event of an engine failure. The take-off weight will have been limited to ensure it is safe to continue take-off with one engine inoperative after having accelerated to V1 with all engines operating.

See also 

 V speeds

References 

Aviation accidents and incidents
Emergency aircraft operations